Dark Duet is a 1942 spy thriller novel by the British writer Peter Cheyney. Cheyney had become known for his hardboiled crime thrillers featuring Lemmy Caution and Slim Callaghan, but this novel was his first fully-fledged espionage novel. The novel is set in wartime London, Lisbon and Ireland. It was published in the United States with the alternative title The Counterspy Murders.

Synopsis
Two British counter-intelligence officers track a network of German agents which they learn is based out of Dublin.

References

Bibliography
 Panek, LeRoy. The Special Branch: The British Spy Novel, 1890-1980. Popular Press, 1981.
 Reilly, John M. Twentieth Century Crime & Mystery Writers. Springer, 2015.
 Wark, Wesley K. Spy Fiction, Spy Films and Real Intelligence. Routledge, 2013.

1942 British novels
Novels by Peter Cheyney
British thriller novels
British spy novels
Novels set in London
Novels set in Lisbon
Novels set in Ireland
William Collins, Sons books
Novels set during World War II